The 2003 Tour was a concert tour by Elton John that took place in 2003 covering two continents, fifteen countries and fifty-three cities.

Background
The 2003 tour started with a befit concert in Anaheim, California, before a concert in Bakersfield. Elton traveled to Europe to perform at two further benefit shows in Paris and London before traveling back to the States again to perform a further two benefit concerts in Atlanta, Georgia. After completing the benefit shows Elton traveled the United States with Billy Joel on their Face to Face tour.

After finishing the Face to Face tour, he performed a series of concerts with the Elton John Band. Elton performed several solo concerts and two concerts with the band. Afterwards, Elton started a whole solo tour of Europe from 24 June through to 23 July.

Elton then returned to the States for several concerts before finishing the tour in Europe.

Tour dates

Festivals and other miscellaneous performances

References

External links

 Information Site with Tour Dates

Elton John concert tours
2003 concert tours